Syeda Sajeda Chowdhury (8 May 1935 – 11 September 2022) was a Bangladeshi politician. She served as a Jatiya Sangsad member representing the Faridpur-2 constituency from 2008 till her death in 2022. She also served as the Environment and Forest Minister of Bangladesh during 1996–2001.

Early life and family
Syeda Sajeda was born on 8 May 1935 in her maternal home in Magura (formerly under Jessore District) in the then Bengal Presidency in British India. Both of her parents, Syed Shah Hamidullah and Syeda Asiya Khatun, were Bengali Muslims of Syed extraction. Her paternal grandmother, Syeda Hamidunnesa, belonged to a Bengali Muslim zamindar family known as the Syeds of Bamna based in Barguna.

Chowdhury had a bachelor's degree.

Political career

Chowdhury became the Jatiya Sangsad member from the Faridpur-2 constituency in 2008, being re-elected in 2014 and 2018,. She became the Deputy Leader of the House of Jatiya Sangsad on 12 February 2019 for the third consecutive term.

Chowdhury became the deputy leader of the House of Bangladesh Parliament in February 2009. She is only woman politician who served as General Secretary of Bangladesh Awami League from 1986 and held the position till 1992. Since then she was inducted into the Presidium.

Chowdhury was awarded Independence Day Award in 2010 by the Government of Bangladesh.

Corruption allegation
On 10 July 2008, the Anti-Corruption Commission (ACC) filed a case against Chowdhury in connection with concealing wealth worth Tk 1.38 million and amassing it illegally. Chowdhury denied the allegation. On 18 November 2008, Bangladesh High Court stayed the proceedings against her in the case which was again upheld by the Supreme Court on 15 February 2010. She was granted bail by the High Court. On 29 November 2010, High Court revoked the proceedings of the case on the grounds that the charges against Chowdhury were not specifically disclosed in the case.

Personal life
Syeda Sajeda married Golam Akbar Chowdhury (d. 2015).  Their youngest son, Shahdab Akbar Chowdhury, was sentenced to 12 years' imprisonment by a special court in 2008. He was convicted for amassing wealth illegally and concealing information in his wealth statement submitted to the ACC.

Chowdhury died from complications of COVID-19 in Dhaka on 11 September 2022 aged 87. After her death, her son, Shahdab, selected by Awami League, ran for the vacant parliamentary position in by-poll election held on 5 November 2022.

References

1935 births
2022 deaths
People from Faridpur District
Awami League politicians
Women government ministers of Bangladesh
21st-century Bangladeshi women politicians
Women members of the Jatiya Sangsad
5th Jatiya Sangsad members
9th Jatiya Sangsad members
10th Jatiya Sangsad members
11th Jatiya Sangsad members
Environment, Forest and Climate Change ministers of Bangladesh
Recipients of the Independence Day Award
20th-century Bangladeshi women politicians
Bangladesh Krishak Sramik Awami League central committee members
Deaths from the COVID-19 pandemic in Bangladesh